Podvolochye is a rural locality (a village) in Plesetsky District, Arkhangelsk Oblast, Russia. The population was 113 as of 2010.

Geography 
Podvolochye is located on the Puksa River, 113 km east of Plesetsk (the district's administrative centre) by road. Alekseyevskaya is the nearest rural locality.

References 

Rural localities in Plesetsky District